Zsuzsanna Nagy (born 10 June 1986) is a Hungarian former competitive ice dancer. With Máté Fejes, she is the 2011 Pavel Roman Memorial champion and a two-time Hungarian national champion. They competed in the final segment at two European Championships. With György Elek, she competed in the free dance at four ISU Championships and also appeared on the senior Grand Prix series.

Personal life 
Zsuzsanna Nagy was born 10 June 1986 in Budapest, Hungary. She is the daughter of Hungarian ice dancers Gabriella Remport and Sándor Nagy.

Career

Early career 
Nagy began skating with David Kriska by 2000. They appeared at three ISU Junior Grand Prix events. They last competed together in early November 2002.

Partnership with Elek 
Nagy teamed up with György Elek in the middle of the 2002–2003 season. The two qualified to the final segment at the 2003 World Junior Championships in Ostrava, Czech Republic, and the 2004 World Junior Championships in The Hague, Netherlands.

After moving up to the senior level, in the 2005–2006 season, Nagy/Elek appeared at two Grand Prix events and became two-time national silver medalists. They competed in the free dance at the 2006 European Championships in Lyon, France, and 2007 European Championships in Warsaw, Poland. They competed in the original dance at the 2007 World Championships in Tokyo, Japan, but did not advance to the free dance.

Nagy/Elek were coached by her parents. Their partnership ended around 2007.

Partnership with Fejes 

Nagy began competing with Fejes in 2009. She broke her skull bone in November 2011 while they were practicing a lift. They became two-time national champions and appeared at six ISU Championships. They competed in the final segment at the 2012 European Championships in Sheffield, England, and 2013 European Championships in Zagreb, Croatia. They competed in the short dance at the 2012 World Championships in Nice, France, and 2013 World Championships in London, Ontario. They were coached by her father.

Programs

With Fejes

With Elek

Competitive highlights
GP: Grand Prix; JGP: Junior Grand Prix

With Fejes

With Elek

With Kriska

References

External links

 
 
 Ice Dance.com: Nagy / Elek

1986 births
Living people
Hungarian female ice dancers
Figure skaters from Budapest